The Park Hill Historic District encompasses the first suburban residential subdivision of the city of North Little Rock, Arkansas. This area was developed beginning in 1922 by Justin Matthews, a major local developer, and greatly expanded the city's housing stock through the 1940s and 1950s. The vast majority of its architecture is residential, with commercial development limited to its major arterial roadways. The district includes Crestview Park and the Park Hill Fire Station and Water Company Complex.

The district was listed on the National Register of Historic Places in 2000.

See also
National Register of Historic Places listings in Pulaski County, Arkansas

References

External links

Historic districts on the National Register of Historic Places in Arkansas
Mission Revival architecture in Arkansas
North Little Rock, Arkansas